Miyaly (Miialy, ميالى; , Miyaly) is a town in Kyzylkoga District, Atyrau Region, west Kazakhstan. It is the center of the Myaly Rural District. It has a population of 6,213.

References

Atyrau Region
Cities and towns in Kazakhstan